The Boeing 7J7 was an American short- to medium-range airliner proposed by American aircraft manufacturer Boeing in the 1980s. It would have carried 150 passengers and was touted as the successor to the successful Boeing 727.  It was initially planned to enter service in 1992.  This was intended as a highly fuel-efficient aircraft employing new technologies, but it was postponed indefinitely as the price of oil dropped during the 1980s.

Development

The 7J7 was the culmination of Boeing's Seven Dash Seven (7–7) 150-seat aircraft idea, which the company had considered since at least 1981. It was to be Boeing's second attempt at a replacement for the Boeing 727, its successful but aging 150-seat aircraft. The Boeing 757, a larger airplane that Boeing expected existing 727 customers to upgrade to, had unexpectedly slow sales leading to its 1983 entry into commercial service, as airline deregulation resulted in airlines using smaller aircraft at increased frequencies. By vacating the 727's seating capacity, Boeing had a large capacity gap in its aircraft lineup between the larger 757 and smaller Boeing 737.

In 1983, Scandinavian Airlines (SAS), an airline that employed aircraft mostly from McDonnell Douglas, contacted Boeing about the aircraft concept to replace its McDonnell Douglas DC-9s. The airline would become the 7J7's most faithful customer, and it would wield a large influence in the aircraft's cabin design. Japan initially agreed to a Letter of Understanding with Boeing in March 1984 to take a 25-percent share in a future 150-seat airliner, such as Boeing's Seven Dash Seven or Japan's "YXX" project, that would enter service in 1988 using the IAE V2500 turbofan as the engine, which was developed in part by the Japanese Aero Engine Corporation. However, Boeing became increasingly interested in the latest propfan engine research that would yield large double-digit fuel savings, in particular with the gearless unducted fan (UDF) concept from the aviation division of General Electric. By February 1985, Boeing postponed the service entry of the then-unnamed aircraft to the early 1990s so that propfan technology would be ready for the plane; Boeing made the engine change, schedule change, and announcement unilaterally, which surprised and upset its Japanese partners. It also scrapped the 7–7 code name, saying that the moniker was too commonly seen as a possible direct competitor to the Airbus A320, and that the aircraft Boeing had in mind would be a half-generation ahead. The company held a program kickoff meeting for suppliers on May 13, 1985, and then it debuted a model of the aircraft concept at the 1985 Paris Air Show, where Boeing announced that it would start taking orders in 1987–1988 for deliveries starting in the first half of 1992. In August 1985, the code name for the aircraft was changed to the 7J7. On December 20, 1985, Boeing reached an agreement to test the proposed 578-DX geared propfan engine of General Motors subsidiary Allison Engine Company for use on the 7J7.

In March 1986, Boeing officially announced Japan's 25 percent participation in the 7J7. The name of the aircraft reflected this participation, as the "J" in 7J7 represented the Japan Aircraft Development Corporation (JADC), a partnership of the large Japanese industrial firms Kawasaki Heavy Industries, Fuji Heavy Industries, and Mitsubishi Heavy Industries (MHI). Shorts from the United Kingdom and Saab-Scania from Sweden also invested in the program a few weeks later, but with smaller, single-digit percentages. Hawker de Havilland of Australia joined with a similar small percentage in December 1986.

During the same week that Boeing made the Japanese 7J7 announcement, SAS held a 13-member board of directors meeting near Boeing headquarters to inspect Boeing's 7J7 work. The airline also expressed its desire to eliminate middle seats in a six-abreast configuration and asked that the cabin include a seven-abreast option for economy travel. Jan Carlzon, SAS's chairman at the time, dangled the possibility of SAS being a launch customer. He suggested that if the 7J7 were built, SAS could become the largest operator of Boeing aircraft within 10 years. In mid-1986, Ireland-based aircraft leasing firm GPA Group also declared its desire to be a 7J7 launch customer.

On August 20, 1986, the General Electric GE36 UDF engine was tested in flight for the first time, on a Boeing 727-100 testbed. The next month at the Farnborough Air Show, Boeing stated that the early acoustical results were better than expected. The company declared that the test levels were already at an acceptable state for quietness and noise quality, and that the production engine would reduce the noise levels a further 12–15 decibels. Boeing also announced that the company would probably build the 7J7 in two versions; the widely known 150-seat version would be joined by a smaller-capacity, 100-to-115 seat version, which might have a different fuselage size but still be powered by GE's UDF. The miniature concept was called the 7J7-110. It would be developed by the same 7J7 team for commonality savings, and the 7J7-110 would be launched 6–12 months after the larger 7J7's kickoff. In December 1986, however, an official from European airframe rival Airbus claimed that Boeing was offering airlines a 110-seat propfan plane and a 150-or-more seat airliner with ducted fans. The claim seemed to be verified when Boeing publicly announced its consideration of using wing-mounted engines with the International Aero Engines (IAE) SuperFan in January 1987. At the same time, the company also reversed its consideration of the smaller 7J7 model, choosing to promote a new 737 derivative instead. Boeing recommitted to the aft-mounted UDF in April, albeit one day after IAE announced that it could not complete the engine by its previous May 1992 target date. Against the protests of Allison and Pratt & Whitney (which had joined Allison in its propfan effort), Boeing also rejected the 578-DX engine due to insufficient power, even though it had not yet tested the engine in flight.

Potential customers, who could afford to be choosier in an oversupplied world aircraft market, were concerned about the economics and noise of the unproven propfan engines, though. The frequent major changes in the aircraft's design also discouraged airplane buyers from committing. Boeing neglected to survey the needs of different airlines before visiting them on a road show, so it was surprised by the unenthusiastic overall response to the 7J7 after the airframer had put so many resources into development. However, by May 1987, the 7J7 was on schedule to begin its official marketing campaign on July 1 and to start manufacturing on September 1 of that year. Boeing did attract public interest in the spring from British Airways, which was considering the 7J7 to replace its 35 Boeing 737-200 aircraft. Also, despite its chairman Robert Crandall saying 12 months earlier that fuel prices were too low to order any propfan aircraft by 1991, American Airlines announced in early August 1987 that it was investigating larger, stretched versions of the 7J7 for a possible order of 100 aircraft.

Postponement

Later that month, Boeing pushed back the scheduled certification of the 7J7 from 1992 to 1993, saying that the market needed time to decide whether it wanted a 140-seat or a 170-seat airplane. In justifying the decision, Boeing mentioned that SAS, British Airways, and American Airlines were the most enthusiastic prospective buyers, but the two European carriers chose a smaller plane, while American wanted the larger size. Other reports had only mentioned SAS preferring the smaller size, but favoring the bigger plane was a consensus of either US-based airlines or a core group of about a dozen airlines that had expressed the most desire in the aircraft. Boeing also expressed worry that if the 7J7 were initially designed at the larger size, the GE UDF would be able to accommodate it, but the UDF engine core might not be capable enough to power future stretches of the 7J7.

On December 16, 1987, Boeing delayed the availability date of the 7J7 indefinitely. The number of engineers devoted to the 7J7, which had already been reduced from 1,000 to 900 in October and then to 600 by December, would be reduced again to 300 in the following weeks. Although SAS publicly stated that it was still ready to order 100 7J7 aircraft in April 1988, the lack of a similar-sized domestic order led Boeing to instead concentrate its resources on further developments of the Boeing 737 and the Boeing 757. By May 25, 1988, while announcing an order for 50 Boeing 757s and 50 further options from American Airlines, Boeing said that it had begun a total rethink about the 7J7 project, dropping the 7J7 name in favor of the more generic term "new medium-sized jet transport."

The 7J7 project technically continued for a long time afterward, although it never again came close to an official launch. In December 1990, the Japanese government was still urging Boeing to build the 7J7, saying that they preferred it to the 777. Two months later, Boeing confirmed that it was still meeting with its Japanese partners twice a year to discuss the 7J7, which was now framed as an eventual replacement for the 737. The aircraft had also devolved to fill a 100 to 170-seat category, a much less narrowly defined market target than before, and Boeing was no longer sure whether it should be a single-aisle or twin-aisle aircraft. Boeing chairman Frank Shrontz renewed the joint 7J7 development agreement with the Japanese firms in Hawaii, and planned to modify their memorandum of understanding. By 1994, Boeing still denied reports that Japan had ended funding of the 7J7, stating that Boeing and Japan each had five people working on the project. Although the demise of the 7J7 project disappointed their aviation industry, Japanese companies contributed significantly larger percentages of subsequent Boeing projects (about 15% of the Boeing 767 and 25% of the Boeing 777). Japanese industry is also a primary foreign partner on the Boeing 787 Dreamliner.

Rudy Hillinga, who in 1985 tried unsuccessfully to sell the 7J7 to Lufthansa as Boeing's head of sales in Germany, later said that he helped kill the 7J7 with Lufthansa's support. Hillinga claimed that if Boeing had continued with the 7J7 effort, the 737 never would have accumulated 10,000 aircraft sales by the early 2010s. However, Alan Mulally, who was director of engineering for the 7J7 and would become the CEO of Ford Motor Company two decades later, stated that the 7J7 was one of the best research and development investments that Boeing ever made.

Competition

Competing with the 7J7 for airline interest was McDonnell Douglas's proposed MD-91 and MD-92, two propfan-powered derivatives of the MD-80; the proposed clean-sheet aircraft MD-94X, another McDonnell Douglas aircraft powered by propfans; the Airbus A320; and Boeing's own 737. The A320 featured a lot of similar advanced technology and electronics but was powered by conventional turbofan engines, as Airbus had rejected propfan technology in 1980, before the A320 was conceived. Both McDonnell Douglas and Airbus believed that Boeing never intended to build the 7J7. The Boeing 737 Next Generation and the 777 incorporate many of the proposed 7J7 improvements.

Design

(Note: This section reflects what was known about the 7J7 concept in August 1987, right before its envisioned entry date was delayed. At that moment, the aircraft was most likely to be launched and was defined to its greatest detail.)

The aircraft was planned to include advanced technology and electronics, such as:

 Fly-by-wire flight control system by GEC Marconi Avionics
 Glass cockpit by Honeywell utilizing LCDs
 Advanced integrated avionics suite
 Widespread use of high-strength composites such as carbon-fiber
 Two General Electric GE36 UDF rear-mounted advanced technology contra-rotating unducted fan (propfan) engines

The sum of all these features promised better fuel consumption by 60 percent compared to any existing large passenger aircraft technology at the time. 43 percentage points of those savings would be due to the propfan engines, 11 percentage points from aerodynamic refinements, four percentage points from structural changes, and two percentage points from systems improvements.

Boeing planned to save  in weight through the use of aluminum-lithium (Al–Li) and composites. The airframer hoped to build the 7J7's wings out of aluminum-lithium, despite the material costing about three times more to use than conventional aluminum alloys. The aircraft could also have many parts built out of composites, including most of the structure behind the aft pressure bulkhead. In the primary structure, Boeing planned to use carbon fiber for the vertical fin, horizontal fin, beams, and stanchions. The secondary structure would contain carbon fiber in the rudder, elevator, aileron, flaps, nose gear and main landing gear doors, engine cowling, and wingtips. Combined carbon and glass fiber would be used for the fixed trailing edges of the wings and empennage, the flap track fairings, wing-to-body fairings, and engine strut fairings.

Cabin

The 7J7 was to have a twin-aisle (2+2+2) seating configuration, giving a wide and spacious cabin for its class, with no passenger more than one seat from an aisle. Alternatively, the aircraft could fit a high-density, seven-abreast (2+3+2) seating configuration with  seats and  aisles.

The twin-aisle setup would reduce passenger onboarding and deboarding times by ten minutes, allowing airlines to plan for 50-percent faster turnaround times compared to its competitors; Boeing's research found that even two  turned passengers around faster than one . The cabin contained modular seat elements so that seat pitch (distance between rows), seat width, and armrest width could be adjusted. It also offered an airline the ability to easily change between six-abreast and seven-abreast configurations overnight.

Flight capability

Boeing also provided a higher gross weight option for the plane by configuring the in-fuselage part of the wing to hold fuel.

Storage

It could be used for bulk storage or to hold standard LD3-46 unit load devices, a smaller size of air cargo container that was entering usage with the debut of the Airbus 320.

Specifications

See also

References

Bibliography

External links

 
 
 
 
 
 
 
 

Abandoned civil aircraft projects of the United States
7J7
Propfan-powered aircraft